USS Mars may refer to the following ships operated by the United States Navy:

 , was a galley built in 1798 and renamed Charleston while under construction
 , was launched 10 April 1909 and sold 22 June 1923
 USS Mars AR-16, was laid down 16 May 1945 but construction was canceled 12 August 1945
 , was launched 15 June 1963 and decommissioned 1 February 1993

See also
 
 Mars (disambiguation)

United States Navy ship names